Conrad Schmidt (born 1969) is a social activist, filmmaker and writer living in Vancouver, British Columbia, Canada, who is best known for his role in founding the Work Less Party of British Columbia and for creating the internationally known World Naked Bike Ride protest.

Biography
Schmidt was born and raised in South Africa and, in 1998, moved to Vancouver where he resides.

Community involvement 
In 2003, Schmidt organised a protest in which 50 demonstrators from Artists Against War formed a peace sign with their naked bodies to protest against possible US action in Iraq. Schmidt created the international clothing-optional World Naked Bike Ride (WNBR) in 2004.

In 2003, Schmidt was a co-ordinator for the Work Less Party of British Columbia, a political party which advocates a 32-hour work week and reduced consumerism.

Media activities 
Schmidt is the author of Workers of the World Relax: The Simple Economics of Less Industrial Work and Efficiency Shifting, and the director of the documentary, Five Ring Circus.

See also
Affluenza
Anti-consumerism
2008 Canadian federal election
Work Less Party

References

External links
 ConradSchmidt.org
Work Less Party web site, includes films and clips, some including Schmidt.
World Naked Bike Ride web site and Wiki site
Artists For Peace and Artists Against War activism web site. This is an archive of the old site, which is now hosted on the Work Less Party web site.
Work Less Party of Victoria
You Never Bike Alone. Documentary includes interview and footage from first WNBR.

Canadian activists
Anti-corporate activists
Writers from Vancouver
Social nudity advocates
Living people
1969 births
Canadian anti-war activists
South African emigrants to Canada
Work Less Party politicians